Olivia Bouyssou Merilahti (born 25 February 1982, Paris), also known as Prudence, is a Finnish-French singer and composer. Her work has been compared to that of Björk, whom she cites as a major influence. Merilahti was born to a French father and a Finnish mother. She primarily uses English in music, which she learned at an early age.Finnish is my intimate language; I speak Finnish with my mum and I've been living in France for most of my life, so it's been my secret language. My secret weapon somehow. So these different languages play different roles in my life, and English has always been the musical one.Having studied classical music in Helsinki, Merilahti gravitated to rock music, then jazz and electronic music. In 2004, during the writing of music from the movie Empire of the Wolves, she met Dan Levy, with whom she formed French indie rock band The Dø. In 2020, she released a solo project under the name Prudence.

Discography
 2005: Empire of the Wolves / Soundtrack
 2008: A Mouthful / The Dø
 2011: Both Ways Open Jaws / The Dø
 2014: Shake, Shook, Shaken / The Dø
 2020: Be Water- EP / Prudence
 2021: Beginnings / Prudence

References

1982 births
Living people
Finnish composers
21st-century Finnish women singers
French film score composers
French women film score composers
Finnish film score composers